These hits topped the Ultratop 50 charts in 2004 (see 2004 in music).

See also
2004 in music

References

2004 in Belgium
Belgium Ultratop 50
2004